Bluebell is a stop on the Luas light-rail tram system in Dublin, Ireland.  It opened in 2004 as a stop on the Red Line.  The stop is located on a section of reserved track in a wide central reservation on the Naas Road dual carriageway in the Bluebell area of Dublin.  It provides access to Drimnagh Castle and Lansdowne Valley Park.  
The stop is also served by Dublin Bus routes 13, 68, and 69.

References

Luas Red Line stops in Dublin (city)